Biira is a surname. Notable people with the surname include:

 Beatrice Biira, Ugandan human rights activist 
 Joy Doreen Biira (born 1986), Ugandan journalist and communications consultant

Surnames of Ugandan origin